Apple Valley is an unincorporated community and census-designated place (CDP) in Burleigh County, North Dakota, United States. It was first listed as a CDP prior to the 2020 census.

The CDP is in southwestern Burleigh County, in the southeast part of Gibbs Township. The CDP is on the north side of the valley of Apple Creek, a southwest-flowing tributary of the Missouri River.

Demographics

References 

Census-designated places in Burleigh County, North Dakota
Census-designated places in North Dakota